Jork is a small town on the left bank of the Elbe, near Hamburg (Germany).

Jork belongs to the district of Stade, in Lower Saxony. The town is the capital of the Altes Land, one of the biggest fruit growing areas in Europe, and Jork is home to a Fruit Research Center.

History
Jork was mentioned for the first time in a deed in 1221, then it belonged to the Prince-Archbishopric of Bremen in secular respect. As to religion Jork belonged to the Roman Catholic Diocese of Verden (till 1648). In 1648 the Prince-Archbishopric was transformed into the Duchy of Bremen, which was first ruled in personal union by the Swedish and from 1715 on by the British and Hanoverian Crown. In 1807 the ephemeric Kingdom of Westphalia annexed the Duchy, before France annexed it in 1810. In 1813 the Duchy was restored to the Electorate of Hanover, which - after its upgrade to the Kingdom of Hanover in 1814 - incorporated the Duchy in a real union and the ducal territory, including Jork, became part of the Stade Region, established in 1823. From 1885 to 1932 Jork served as the capital of the Prussian District of Jork, comprising Altes Land, the city of Buxtehude and its today component Neuland, then still an independent municipality. The former district forms since a part of today's District of Stade.

Division of the town 
Jork consists of seven districts:
 Borstel
 Estebrügge
 Hove
 Jork
 Königreich
 Ladekop 
 Moorende

References

External links
  

Stade (district)